Asimina triloba, the American papaw, pawpaw, paw paw, or paw-paw, among many regional names, is a small deciduous tree native to the eastern United States and Canada, producing a large, yellowish-green to brown fruit. Asimina is the only temperate genus in the tropical and subtropical flowering plant family Annonaceae, and Asimina triloba has the most northern range of all. Well-known tropical fruits of different genera in family Annonaceae include the custard-apple, cherimoya, sweetsop, ylang-ylang, and soursop.

The pawpaw is a patch-forming (clonal) understory tree of hardwood forests, which is found in well-drained, deep, fertile bottomland and also hilly upland habitat. It has large, simple leaves with drip tips, more characteristic of plants in tropical rainforests than within this species' temperate range. Pawpaw fruits are the largest edible fruit indigenous to the United States (not counting gourds, which are typically considered vegetables rather than fruit for culinary purposes, although in botany they are classified as fruit).

Pawpaw fruits are sweet, with a custard-like texture, and a flavor somewhat similar to banana, mango, and pineapple. They are commonly eaten raw, but are also used to make ice cream and baked desserts. The bark, leaves, and seeds contain the insecticidal neurotoxin annonacin.

Names

This plant's scientific name is Asimina triloba. The genus name Asimina is adapted from the Native American (probably Miami-Illinois) name  or  through the French colonial . The specific epithet triloba in the species' scientific name refers to the flowers' three-lobed calyx (green in photo at right) and doubly three-lobed corollas, the shape not unlike a tricorne hat.

The common name of this species is variously spelled pawpaw, paw paw, paw-paw, and papaw. It probably derives from the Spanish papaya, an American tropical and subtropical fruit (Carica papaya) sometimes also called "papaw", perhaps because of the superficial similarity of their fruits and the fact that both have very large leaves. The name pawpaw or papaw, first recorded in print in English in 1598, originally meant the giant herb Carica papaya or its fruit (as it still commonly does in many English-speaking communities, including Australia, New Zealand, and South Africa). Daniel F. Austin's Florida Ethnobotany states that:

The original "papaw" ... is Carica papaya. By 1598, English-speaking people in the Caribbean were calling these plants "pawpaws" or "papaws" ... [yet later, when English-speakers settled in] the temperate Americas, they found another tree with a similarly aromatic, sweet fruit. It reminded them of the "papaya", which had already become "papaw", so that is what they called these different plants ...  By 1760, the names "papaw" and "pawpaw" were being applied to A. triloba.

Yet A. triloba has had numerous local common names, many of which compare it to a banana rather than to Carica papaya. These include: wild banana, prairie banana, Indiana banana, Hoosier banana, West Virginia banana, Kansas banana, Kentucky banana, Michigan banana, Missouri banana, Appalachian banana, Ozark banana, Indian banana, banango, and the poor man's banana, as well as American custard apple, asimoya, Quaker delight, and hillbilly mango.

Due to increased interest in the foraging and locavore food movement during the late 2010s and the COVID-19 pandemic, the pawpaw has been referred to tongue-in-cheek as the "hipster banana".

Description

The large leaves of pawpaw trees are clustered symmetrically at the ends of the branches, giving a distinctive imbricated appearance to the tree's foliage.

The petioles are short and stout, with a prominent adaxial groove. Stipules are lacking. The expanding leaves are conduplicate, green, covered with rusty tomentum beneath, and hairy above; when fully grown they are smooth, dark green above, and paler beneath. When bruised, the leaves have a disagreeable odor similar to a green bell pepper. In autumn, the leaves are a rusty yellow, allowing pawpaw groves to be spotted from a long distance.

They are borne singly on stout, hairy, axillary peduncles. The flowers are produced in early spring at the same time as or slightly before the new leaves appear, and have a faint fetid or yeasty smell.

The conspicuous fruits begin developing after the plants flower; they are initially green, maturing by September or October to yellow or brown. When mature, the heavy fruits bend the weak branches down.

Other characteristics:
 Calyx: Sepals three, valvate in bud, ovate, acuminate, pale green, downy
 Corolla: Petals six, in two rows, imbricate in the bud; inner row acute, erect, nectariferous; outer row broadly ovate, reflexed at maturity; petals at first are green, then brown, and finally become dull purple or maroon and conspicuously veiny
 Stamens: Indefinite, densely packed on the globular receptacle; filaments short; anthers extrorse, two-celled, opening longitudinally
 Pollen: Shed as permanent tetrads
 Pistils: Several, on the summit of the receptacle, projecting from the mass of stamens; ovary one-celled; stigma sessile; ovules many
 Branchlets: Light brown, tinged with red, marked by shallow grooves
 Winter buds: Small, of two kinds, the leaf buds pointed and closely appressed to the twigs, and the flower buds round, brown, and fuzzy
 Bark: Light gray, sometimes blotched with lighter gray spots, sometimes covered with small excrescences, divided by shallow fissures; inner bark tough, fibrous; bark with a very disagreeable odor when bruised
 Wood: Pale, greenish yellow, sapwood lighter; light, soft, coarse-grained and spongy with a specific gravity of  0.3969 and a density of 
 Longevity of fruit production: Undetermined

Range and ecology 

The pawpaw is native to the Eastern, Southern, and Midwestern United States and adjacent Ontario, Canada, from New York west to southeastern Nebraska, and south to northern Florida and eastern Texas.

The tree is commonly found in the wild within floodplains and shady, rich bottomlands, but it requires somewhat elevated slopes because it has a deep-reaching taproot. Owing to its shallow, horizontally spreading stems (rhizomes), the species tends to become a clonal patch of small, leaning trees through time. (See photos at right.)

Pawpaws are not the first to colonize a disturbed site, but because they are capable of growing in deep shade, they can establish from seed beneath mature hardwood trees and then spread into a subcanopy patch. They may even become dominant through time by depriving native canopy trees from re-establishing via seed after tree-fall, owing to the dense shade within a pawpaw patch. Under such circumstances, the pawpaw subcanopy becomes the forest canopy. Accessing full sunlight, the patch is then capable of producing more fruit.

The fruits of the pawpaw are eaten by a variety of mammals, including raccoons, gray foxes, opossums, squirrels, and black bears.

The strong-smelling leaves, twigs, and bark of pawpaws contain natural insecticides known as acetogenins. Pawpaw leaves and twigs are seldom consumed by rabbits, deer, or goats, or by many insects. However, mules have been seen eating pawpaw leaves in Maryland.

Larvae of the zebra swallowtail (Protographium marcellus), a butterfly, feed exclusively on young leaves of A. triloba and various other pawpaw (Asimina) species, but never occur in great numbers on the plants. Chemicals in the pawpaw leaves confer protection from predation throughout the butterflies' lives, as trace amounts of acetogenins remain present, making them unpalatable to birds and other predators.

Other insects which have evolved the ability to consume pawpaws include Talponia plummeriana, the pawpaw peduncle borer, whose larvae can be found in flowers, and Omphalocera munroei, the asimina webworm, whose larvae mostly feed upon leaves.

Pollination 

The floral scent of Asimina triloba has been described as "yeasty," which is one of several features that signify a "beetle pollination syndrome." Other floral features of pawpaw indicative of beetle pollination include petals that curve over the downward-pointing flower center, along with food-rich fleshy bases of the inner whorl of petals. A "pollination chamber" is thereby created at a depth that only small beetles can access during the initial female-receptive stage of floral bloom. As with other well-studied species of Annonaceae, the delay in the shift from female to male floral stage offers beetles a secure, and possibly thermogenic, residence in which not only to feed but also to mate. Receptive stigmas at their arrival, followed by pollen-shedding stamens during pollinator departure is regarded as an early form of mutualism (biology) evolved between plants and insects that is still dominant in the most ancient lineages of flowering plants, including the Magnoliids (of which Annonaceae is the most species-rich taxonomic family).

Beetles are the dominant form of pollinator ascribed for genera and species within Family Annonaceae. However, two species of genus Asimina (Asimina triloba and Asimina parviflora) bear a floral character that has given rise to an alternative hypothesis that carrion or dung flies are their effective pollinators. That floral characteristic is the dark maroon color of the petals. Hence, while no scholarly papers have documented carrion or dung flies as effective pollinators in field observations, the strength of this hypothesis has led to placement of carrion during the bloom time in pawpaw orchards by some horticultural growers.

Professional papers on genus Asimina and its species have warned of the difficulties in discerning whether insects observed on or collected from flowers are effective pollinators or merely casual and thus opportunistic visitors.

Conservation status

On a global (range-wide) scale, the common pawpaw (A. triloba) has a NatureServe global conservation rank of G5 (very common). The species is, however, listed for conservation concern in the northernmost parts of its range, owing to the happenstance of where governmental boundaries exist. In the United States, the species has an N5 (very common), but is considered a threatened species in New York, and an endangered species in New Jersey. In Canada, where the species is found only in portions of southern Ontario, it has a  rank of N3 (vulnerable), and a NatureServe subnational conservation rank of S3 (vulnerable) in Ontario. The Ontario Ministry of Natural Resources has given the species a general status of "Sensitive", and its populations there are monitored.

In areas in which deer populations are dense, pawpaws appear to be becoming more abundant locally, since the deer avoid them, but consume seedlings of most other woody plants.

History
The natural seed dispersal of the common pawpaw in North America, prior to the ice ages and lasting until roughly 10,000 years ago, occurred via the dung of certain megafauna (such as mastodons, mammoths, and giant ground sloths) until they became extinct during the Quaternary extinction event — a parallel case in North America to that of the avocado in South and Central America. After the arrival of humans and the subsequent extinction of megafauna that were distributing A. triloba, the probable distribution of these large fruit-bearing plants has been by humans.

Indigenous peoples value pawpaw not only for its fruit but also for its bark. The bark has traditionally been used as a fiber source. Now that the exotic emerald ash borer beetle is destroying black ash trees (Fraxinus nigra), a basketmaker of the Little Traverse Bay Bands of Odawa Indians in northern Michigan has begun planting pawpaw seeds on tribal lands several hundred miles north of pawpaw's historically native range.

The earliest documented mention of pawpaws is in the 1541 report of the Spanish de Soto expedition, who found Native Americans east of the Mississippi River cultivating what some have identified as the pawpaw. The tree's scientific name (Asimina triloba) comes from the Powhatan word Assimina, which a Jamestown settler transcribed in 1612 as “wheat plum". The Lewis and Clark Expedition consumed pawpaws during their travels. Thomas Jefferson planted it at Monticello, his plantation in Virginia. Legend has it that chilled pawpaw fruit was a favorite dessert of George Washington.

Research
Kentucky State University (KSU) has the only full-time pawpaw research program in the world; it was started in 1990 with the aim of developing pawpaw as a new tree-fruit crop for Kentucky. Pawpaw is the largest native fruit in North America and has very few diseases compared to other orchard crops. KSU is the site of the USDA National Clonal Germplasm Repository for Asimina species and the pawpaw orchards at KSU contain over 1,700 trees. Research activities include germplasm collection and variety trials, and efforts are directed towards improving propagation, understanding fruit ripening and storage, and developing orchard management practices. Cultivation is best in hardiness zones 5-9 and trees take 7–8 years from seedling to fruiting. KSU has created the three cultivars KSU-'Atwood', KSU-'Benson', and KSU-'Chappell', with foci on better flavors, higher yields, vigorous plants, and low seed-to-pulp ratios.

Cultivation

Cultivation is best in hardiness zones 5-9 and trees take 7–8 years from seedling to fruiting. Cross-pollination of at least two different genetic varieties of the plant is recommended. Scholarly research is insufficient for horticulturalists to adopt best methods for attracting insect pollinators, as effective pollinators have not yet been distinguished from casual insect visitors. Therefore, some growers resort to hand pollination or use pollinator attractants, such as spraying fish emulsion or hanging chicken necks or other meat near the open flowers to attract pollinators.

While pawpaws are larval hosts for the zebra swallowtail butterfly, these caterpillars are usually present only at low density, and not detrimental to the foliage of the trees.

Pawpaws have not been cultivated for their fruits on the scale of apples or peaches, primarily because pawpaw fruits ripen to the point of fermentation soon after they are picked, and only frozen fruit stores or ships well. Other methods of preservation include dehydration, production of jams or jellies, and pressure canning (using the numerical values for bananas). Methods of separating seeds from the pulp are still in the experimental phase. Mechanical methods are most efficient, but any splitting or injury of seeds can contaminate the remaining pulp with seed poisons.

Cultivation of pawpaws for fruit production has attracted interest, particularly among organic growers, as a fruit with few to no pests that can successfully be grown in its native environment without pesticides. The commercial cultivation and harvesting of pawpaws is strong in southeastern Ohio and also being explored in Kentucky and Maryland, as well as various areas outside the species' native range, including California, the Pacific Northwest, and Massachusetts. 
The pawpaw is used for landscaping due to its distinctive growth habit, the appeal of its fresh fruit, and its relatively low maintenance needs once established.

Propagation

Trees are easily grown from seed. Seeds should not be permitted to dry, as they  lose viability if they dehydrate to 5% moisture. They will lose their viability if stored for 3 years or more; some seeds survive if stored for 2 years. Germination is hypogeal and cotyledons remain within the seed coat. Strictly speaking, hypogeal means the cotyledons stay in the soil, acting as a food store for the seedling until the plumule emerges from the soil on the epicotyl or true stem. Because the large seeds contain enough energy to produce a long taproot prior to seeking photosynthetic opportunities above ground, the seed itself will be pushed upward and into the air if germinated in standard pots. (See photo at right.)

Propagation using cuttings has generally not been successful.

Desirable cultivars are propagated by chip budding or whip grafting onto a root stock. Pawpaw seeds do not grow "true to type" — each individual seed in a fruit is genetically different from the others and from its parent tree. Purchased cultivars do not produce seeds true to type, either, which is why cultivars are all grafted trees. Root sucker seedlings, however, are all genetically identical to their host.

Commercial nurseries usually ship seedlings in containers, usually grafted cultivars, but other nurseries such as the Kentucky Division of Forestry ship bareroot seedlings for reforestation projects and area homeowners.

Harvesting seedlings from the forest floor is tricky because most forest-floor seedlings are actually root suckers with few roots, and those seedlings that did grow from a seed have deep taproots.

Cultivars 
Over the years, many cultivars of A. triloba have been developed or discovered. Many have been lost and are no longer available commercially.

The named varieties producing large fruit and performing well in Kentucky per research trials are 'NC-1', 'Overleese', 'Potomac', 'Shenandoah', 'Sunflower', 'Susquehanna', 'Wabash', KSU-'Atwood', KSU-'Benson', and KSU-'Chappell'.

Habitat restoration
Pawpaws are sometimes included in ecological restoration plantings, since this tree grows well in wet soil and has a strong tendency to form well-rooted clonal thickets.

Uses

Fruits
As described by horticulturist Barbara Damrosch, the fruit of the pawpaw "looks a bit like mango, but with pale yellow, custardy, spoonable flesh and black, easy-to-remove seeds." Wild-collected pawpaw fruits, ripe in late August to mid-September, have long been a favorite treat throughout the tree's extensive native range in eastern North America, and on occasion are sold locally at farmers' markets. Pawpaw fruits have a sweet,  custard-like flavor somewhat similar to banana, mango, and cantaloupe, varying significantly by source or cultivar, with more protein than most fruits. Nineteenth-century American agronomist E. Lewis Sturtevant described pawpaws as

... a natural custard, too luscious for the relish of most people

Ohio botanist William B. Werthner noted that 
The fruit ... has a tangy wild-wood flavor peculiarly its own. It is sweet, yet rather cloying to the taste and a wee bit puckery – only a boy can eat more than one at a time.

Fresh fruits of the pawpaw are commonly eaten raw, either chilled or at room temperature. However, they can be kept only 2–3 days at room temperature, or about a week if refrigerated. The easily bruised pawpaw fruits do not ship well unless frozen. Where pawpaws grow, the fruit pulp is also often used locally in baked dessert recipes, with pawpaw often substituted with volumetric equivalency in many banana-based recipes. Pawpaws may also be blended into ice cream or included in pancakes.

Nutrition

According to a report from the KSU Pawpaw Program (right table), raw pawpaw (with skin) is 19% carbohydrates, 1% protein, 1% fat, and 79% water (estimated). In a 100-g reference amount, the raw fruit provides 80 Calories and is a rich source (20% or more of the Daily Value, DV) of vitamin C (22% DV), magnesium (32% DV), iron (54% DV), and manganese (124% DV). The fruit also contains a moderate amount of vitamin A (11% DV).

Phytochemicals 

Phytochemical extracts of the leaves and fruit contain acetogenins, including the neurotoxin annonacin. The seeds and bark contain the chemical asimitrin and other acetogenins, including asimin, asiminacin and asiminecin.

Effect on insects
Due to the presence of acetogenins, the leaves, twigs, and bark of pawpaw trees can be used to make an organic insecticide. The only insect species immune to these insecticidal compounds is the zebra swallowtail butterfly (Protographium marcellus), whose larvae feed on the leaves of various species of Asimina, conferring protection from predation throughout the butterflies' lives, as trace amounts of acetogenins remain present, making them unpalatable to birds and other predators.

Historical uses
The tough, fibrous inner bark of the pawpaw was used by Native Americans and settlers in the Midwest for making ropes, fishing nets, and mats, and for stringing fish.

Pawpaw logs have been used for split-rail fences in Arkansas.

The hard, brown, shiny lima-bean-sized seeds were sometimes carried as pocket pieces in Ohio.

Cultural significance

Old song
A traditional American folk song portrays wild harvesting of pawpaws; Arty Schronce of the Georgia Department of Agriculture gives these lyrics:

He notes that "picking up pawpaws" refers to gathering the ripe, fallen fruit from beneath the trees, and that the "pocket" in the song is that of an apron or similar tie-on pocket, not a modern pants or blue-jeans pocket, into which pawpaws would hardly fit. A "pawpaw patch" refers to the plant's characteristic patch-forming clonal growth habit.

Place names
The pawpaw is the basis for various place and school names in the United States, almost all using the older spelling variant "paw paw".

 The Paw Paw Tunnel on the Chesapeake and Ohio Canal in Maryland is a 3118-foot (950-m) canal tunnel completed in 1850 to bypass about 5 miles of the 6-mile-long Paw Paw Bends of the Potomac River near the town of Paw Paw, West Virginia, all ultimately named after the pawpaw tree.
 In Michigan, the Paw Paw River is named for the pawpaw trees that grew along its banks. Paw Paw Lake and Little Paw Paw Lake are both tributaries to the river. The town of Paw Paw, Michigan, is located at the junction of two branches of the Paw Paw River. The Paw Paw Railroad (1857–1887) operated a 4-mile (6.4-km) rail line between Lawton and Paw Paw, in Van Buren County, Michigan.
 The village of Paw Paw, Illinois, was named after a nearby grove of pawpaw trees.
 The community of Paw Paw, Indiana, in Miami County, and  Paw Paw Township in DeKalb County and Paw Paw Township in Wabash County are all named after groves of native pawpaw trees.
 Paw Paw, Kentucky, a community in easternmost Kentucky, was named after the native fruit tree.
 The (now empty) town of Paw Paw, Missouri, was named after the trees.

Art

 Nineteenth-century naturalist and painter John James Audubon included pawpaw foliage and fruits in the background of his illustration of the yellow-billed cuckoo (Coccyzus americanus) in his classic work, The Birds of America (1827–1838).
 Pawpaw fruits and a pawpaw leaf are featured in the painting Still Life with Pawpaws (circa 1870–1875) by Edward Edmondson, Jr. (1830–1884), at the Dayton Art Institute in Dayton, Ohio.

Other
 The third Thursday in September has been designated as National Pawpaw Day by the National Day Calendar. It was announced on September 19, 2019, at Kentucky State University's monthly sustainable agriculture workshop, the Third Thursday Thing.
 The pawpaw was designated as Ohio's state native fruit in 2009.
 Since 1999, the Ohio Pawpaw Growers' Association has sponsored an annual Ohio Pawpaw Festival at Lake Snowden, near Albany, Ohio.
 Since 2012, Delaware's Alapocas Run State Park has hosted an annual Pawpaw Folk Festival featuring tastings of the fruit.
 The larva of the Pawpaw sphinx moth feeds on pawpaw leaves.
Since 2019, the pawpaw has been the official state fruit tree of Missouri.
 The endangered French variety of Missouri is known by outsiders and some native speakers as "Paw-Paw French."

See also
Meiogyne cylindrocarpa (fingersop)

References

Further reading

External links

 Kentucky State University Pawpaw Program
 The Pawpaw: Foraging For America's Forgotten Fruit''

triloba
Crops originating from North America
Edible fruits
Fiber plants
Medicinal plants of North America
Plants described in 1753
Taxa named by Carl Linnaeus
Trees of the Southeastern United States
Trees of the North-Central United States
Trees of the Northeastern United States
Trees of the Southern United States
Trees of Ontario
Trees of the South-Central United States
Trees of the Great Lakes region (North America)
Trees of the United States
Fruit trees
Fruits originating in North America
Trees of North America
Trees of the Eastern United States
Trees of Canada
Trees of Eastern Canada